Ab Bar Rural District is in the Central District of Tarom County, Zanjan province, Iran. At the National Census of 2006, its population was 4,870 in 1,097 households. There were 4,908 inhabitants in 1,328 households at the following census of 2011. At the most recent census of 2016, the population of the rural district was 4,511 in 1,334 households. The largest of its 17 villages was Hezarrud-e Olya, with 1,044 people.

References 

Tarom County

Rural Districts of Zanjan Province

Populated places in Zanjan Province

Populated places in Tarom County